Brother Jug! is an album by saxophonist Gene Ammons recorded in 1969 and released on the Prestige label. It contains material from the same two dates as The Boss Is Back! (1969).

Reception
AllMusic awarded the album 3 stars with its review by Stewart Mason stating, "A swinging soul-jazz set from just before the point where soul-jazz turned once and for all into fusion, 1970's Brother Jug is very much an album of its time... while the album doesn't have the classic timelessness of Gene Ammons' best '50s and early-'60s work, Brother Jug is one of Ammons' better albums released soon after the tenor saxophonist's release from a seven-year prison sentence".

"Jungle Strut" was covered by Santana in the 1971 album Santana III.

Track listing 
All compositions by Gene Ammons except where noted.
 "Son of a Preacher Man" (John Hurley, Ronnie Wilkins) – 4:27
 "Didn't We" (Graham Lyle, Troy Seals) – 6:04 
 "He's a Real Gone Guy" (Nellie Lutcher) – 5:05 
 "Jungle Strut" – 5:11 
 "Blue Velvet" (Lee Morris, Bernie Wayne) – 4:06  
 "Ger-Ru" – 8:49

Recorded at Van Gelder Studio in Englewood Cliffs, New Jersey on November 10 (track 6) and November 11 (tracks 1–5), 1969

Personnel 
Gene Ammons – tenor saxophone
Sonny Phillips – organ (tracks 1–5)
Junior Mance – piano (track 6)
Billy Butler – guitar (tracks 1, 4)
Bob Bushnell – electric bass (tracks 1–5)
Buster Williams – bass (track 6)
Frankie Jones (track 6), Bernard Purdie (tracks 1–5) – drums
Candido – congas (track 6)

References 

Gene Ammons albums
1970 albums
Prestige Records albums
Albums produced by Bob Porter (record producer)
Albums recorded at Van Gelder Studio